Kõima is a village in Lääneranna Parish, Pärnu County in southwestern Estonia.

References

Villages in Pärnu County